Legiamayo or Lejiamayu (possibly from Quechua lliklla a rectangular shoulder cloth, mayu river) is a river in Peru located in the Ancash Region, Carhuaz Province, Marcará District. It originates in the Cordillera Blanca west of mount Copa, near Lake Lejiacocha. It is a tributary of Marcará River, which in turn is tributary of Santa River.

References

Rivers of Peru
Rivers of Ancash Region